Radical 209 meaning "nose" is 1 of 2 Kangxi radicals (214 radicals total) composed of 14 strokes.

In the Kangxi Dictionary there are 49 characters (out of 49,030) to be found under this radical.

Characters with Radical 209

Literature

See also
Unihan Database - U+9F3B

209